Carlton McCarthy (1847–1936) was the mayor of Richmond (Virginia, United States) from 1904 to 1908.

Civil War writings
Prior to this, he served as a soldier in the Confederate Army. He fought in local armies but was not formally enlisted private until 1864 in the Richmond Howitzers of the Army of Northern Virginia. He wrote a book about his four years of Civil War experience called Detailed Minutiae of Soldier Life in the Army of Northern Virginia 1861-1865., first published by Carlton McCarthy and Company in 1882  with a second edition published in 1888.  A copy of this book is on display at the Museum of the Confederacy as well as at the Virginia Historical Society.

His writings have been featured in other publications, such as chapter 6 of The Civil War Soldier: A Historical Reader by Michael Barton, Larry M. Logue and a chapter in Albert Bushnell Hart's book, The Romance of the Civil War, published in 1896 and now in the public domain.

Biographies

Mary Holt Carlton wrote a book about Carlton in 1986, called Richmond's `Live Wire' Mayor 1904-1908.

McCarthy died in 1936 at the age of 89

Civic contributions
Besides being Richmond's elected mayor from 1904 to 1908, McCarthy also made other contributions to Richmond life, such as being the primary author of a 1914 ordinance to adopt a Richmond flag.

McCarthy also authored a book in 1871 (published by McCarthy & Ellyson) entitled Walks about Richmond: a story for boys, and a guide to persons visiting the city, desiring to see the principal points of interest.

In 1894, McCarthy was the orator at the unveiling of Richmond's Confederate Soldiers and Sailors Monument.

References
Notes

Bibliography
  Carlton McCarthy's Memorial Day speech on 1887 in Augusta County, Virginia.

External links

 
 
 

1847 births
1936 deaths
Mayors of Richmond, Virginia
Confederate States Army soldiers